The Metropolitan Redevelopment Authority (MRA) was a statutory authority of the Government of Western Australia. It was established on 1 January 2012 pursuant to the Metropolitan Redevelopment Authority Act 2011 and reported to the Minister for Planning.

The Act "... provide[s] for the planning and redevelopment of, and the control of development in certain land in the metropolitan region; and to establish a State agency with planning, development control, land acquisition and disposal and other functions in respect of that land."

The MRA combined the responsibilities and projects formerly undertaken by former redevelopment authorities for East Perth, Subiaco, Midland and Armadale. Projects overseen by the MRA have included Elizabeth Quay, Perth City Link, Perth Cultural Centre and Yagan Square. 

In 2019 the MRA merged with LandCorp to form DevelopmentWA.

References

 
Statutory agencies of Western Australia
Urban development authorities
2011 establishments in Australia
2019 disestablishments in Australia